James Lloyd "Doc" Abbot, IV (June 26, 1918 – August 10, 2012) was an American U.S. Navy admiral from Mobile, Alabama.  He graduated from the U.S. Naval Academy in 1939.  Abbot was the commanding officer of the attack aircraft carrier , which dispatched a helicopter to pick up astronaut Scott Carpenter.  He was promoted to rear admiral on May 30, 1967.

Abbot also operated near Antarctica, assuming command of the U.S. Naval Support Force, Antarctica, in February 1967.  The Abbot Ice Shelf is named after him.  His awards include two Legion of Merit awards and the Navy Commendation Medal.

Abbot was still flying his own airplane past the age of 90 with the Federal Aviation Administration telling Abbot that he couldn't fly alone.  He is survived by two sons, retired U.S. Navy Captain J. Lloyd Abbot, III and retired U.S. Navy Admiral Charles S. Abbot; both are former Navy aviators.

Although he was commonly known as James Lloyd Abbot Jr., he is actually the son of U.S. Navy officer Captain James Lloyd Abbot, III (1888–1988).

Abbot graduated from flight school in Miami, Florida, on November 25, 1941.

Awards

References

1918 births
2012 deaths
United States Navy rear admirals (lower half)
United States Naval Academy alumni
United States Navy personnel of World War II